PA7 may refer to:
 Pennsylvania Route 7
 Pennsylvania's 7th congressional district
 Piper PA-7, a light aircraft of the 1940s
 Pitcairn PA-7 Super Mailwing, a biplane of the 1920s